Rakuten DX is a software company specialising in no-code development platforms to build mobile apps for smartphones, tablets and web designed for enterprises and digital publishers.
Headquartered in Montpellier, France, Rakuten DX is a major subsidiary of Rakuten.

Sector 

Rakuten DX provides mobile application tools & digital experience services for enterprises designed to support businesses in their digital transformation. With Rakuten DX software companies can build smartphone, tablet and web apps for their sales reps, investors and communications teams.  Aquafadas also specialises in solutions for digital newspapers, magazines and e-text books.

Company history

The founders 
Claudia Zimmer (CEO), previously an architect, and Matthieu Kopp (CTO) with a degree of engineering (École Centrale Paris) and PhD in astrophysics. With 11 years of software development experience, they previously spent 5 years running the Application Networks startup in London and founded Aquafadas in 2006.

Headquarters 
Rakuten DX headquarters are in Montpellier, France, and also has offices in Paris.

Key dates 
 2004: Creation of the first software, iDive
 2006: Aquafadas founded as a company by Claudia Zimmer and Matthieu Kopp. PulpMotion, the second software, launches.
 2007: BannerZest – software designed to create Flash banners – enters the market. The same year Ave!Comics, book store for digital comic books owned by Aquafadas, starts to gain attention in the comic books world.
 2008: VideoPier launch
 December 2008, the latest Lucky Luke comic book on iPhone goes on sale thanks to the Ave!Comics3 tools
 2009: SnapFlow launch
 May 2009, creation of Ave!Comics3 Production
 2010: BannerZest for Windows goes live. BannerZest Fun Pics Facebook app launches. Plug-in PulpFx created in partnership with Noise Industries goes live. Digital publications for Fnac and Orange enter the market. Launch of mobile apps for: RMC Sport, La Tribune and Reader's Digest.
 2011: Partnership with Quark to make Aquafadas technology compatible with Quark 9 et Quark QPS. Adobe InDesign 4 Plugin designed for digital publishing goes live. New clients using Aquafadas tools for their digital publications: La Réunion des Musées Nationaux – Grand Palais, Reader's Digest, La Tribune, Bayard, and Carlsen.
 2012: The Canadian e-reading company Kobo_Inc. acquires Aquafadas.
 2017: Aquafadas becomes a major subsidiary of the Rakuten Group, appointing Yasufumi Hirai as Chairman and Koichiro Takahara as CEO.
 July 2017: Aquafadas becomes Rakuten Aquafadas as a part of corporate rebranding and integration within the Rakuten Group
 November 23, 2020: Rakuten Aquafadas becomes Rakuten DX.

International presence

Partner network 
Rakuten DX has an international presence with 25 partner companies across the world:
 Latin America: Panama ; Mexico ; Brazil ; San Salvador ; Argentina ; Costa Rica.
 North America: Canada ; USA.
 EMEA : Emirates ; Kuwait ; Turkey ; France ; Spain ; Italy.
 Asia : Japan (3 partners), China (3 partners), Thailand.

Kobo acquisition in 2012 
With the acquisition by the Canadian e-reading company in 2012, Aquafadas became part of the Rakuten group.

Notes

Companies based in Languedoc-Roussillon
Publishing software
Software companies of France
Rakuten
Software companies established in 2006
French companies established in 2006
Kobo Inc.